Robert Arthur Sprecher (May 30, 1917 – May 15, 1982) was a United States circuit judge of the United States Court of Appeals for the Seventh Circuit.

Education and career

Born in Chicago, Illinois, Sprecher received an Associate of Arts degree from Central YMCA College in 1936, a Bachelor of Science degree from Northwestern University in 1938, and a Juris Doctor from Northwestern University School of Law in 1941. He was in private practice in Chicago from 1941 to 1971. He was a bar examiner for the State of Illinois from 1949 to 1971. He was a special assistant to the attorney general of Illinois from 1957 to 1963.

Federal judicial service

On March 29, 1971, Sprecher was nominated by President Richard Nixon to a seat on the United States Court of Appeals for the Seventh Circuit vacated by Judge Latham Castle. Sprecher was confirmed by the United States Senate on April 21, 1971, and received his commission on April 23, 1971. Sprecher served in that capacity until his death on May 15, 1982.

References

Sources
 

1917 births
1982 deaths
Lawyers from Chicago
Aurora University alumni
Northwestern University alumni
Judges of the United States Court of Appeals for the Seventh Circuit
United States court of appeals judges appointed by Richard Nixon
20th-century American judges